Sheila Holzworth (August 28, 1961 – March 29, 2013) was an American para-alpine skier. After going blind at age ten, she went on to win two gold medals and a silver medal at the 1984 Winter Paralympics as part of the United States delegation, among other achievements.

Biography
In 1981, the International Year of Disabled Persons, Holzworth was the first blind woman to climb Mount Rainier. She completed the climb as part of a team of people with disabilities.

In 1982, she won a gold medal in the giant slalom and silver in the slalom at the national ski competition hosted by the United States Association of Blind Athletes.

Holzworth won gold medals in two alpine skiing events, Women's Giant Slalom B1 and Women's Alpine Combination B1, at the 1984 Winter Paralympics. In addition, she won a silver medal in Women's Downhill B1. She also competed at the 1988 Winter Paralympics.

She competed and won medals in several other competitions, including the World Cup Championships of Winter Sports for the Disabled in Switzerland and the National Snow Ski Competition and American Blind Water Ski Championships in 1983, and the International Blind Water Ski Competition in Norway in 1984. She also set other records, including a world record in trick water skiing for the blind and disabled in 1989, and being the first sightless person to jump on water skis in the United States.

She won the Ten Outstanding Young Americans award in 1989. She was invited to White House receptions at different times by Presidents Ronald Reagan and George H. W. Bush.

References

External links
 

American female alpine skiers
Alpine skiers at the 1984 Winter Paralympics
Paralympic silver medalists for the United States
Paralympic alpine skiers of the United States
Medalists at the 1984 Winter Paralympics
Paralympic medalists in alpine skiing
1961 births
2013 deaths
21st-century American women